Kinde may refer to:

Kinde, Michigan, United States
kinde, a type of arched harp found in Chad
kinde, an archaic spelling of "kind". See Kindness

People with the surname
Annamária Kinde (1956–2014), Romanian-born Hungarian journalist, poet and editor
Per Kinde (1887–1924), Swedish sport shooter